Justice Fletcher may refer to:

Norman S. Fletcher (born 1934), associate justice and chief justice of the Supreme Court of Georgia
Richard Fletcher (American politician) (1788–1869), associate justice of the Massachusetts Supreme Judicial Court
Robert Virgil Fletcher (1869–1960), associate justice of the Supreme Court of Mississippi
William A. Fletcher (Michigan judge) (1788–1852), chief justice of Michigan Supreme Court

See also
Judge Fletcher (disambiguation)